The Greatest Hits of Ike & Tina Turner is the first greatest hits album by Ike & Tina Turner, released on Sue Records in 1965. It contains songs from their albums The Soul of Ike & Tina, Dynamite!, Don't Play Me Cheap, and It's Gonna Work Out Fine. One song, "Mind In A Whirl," was a non-album track released as the B-side to the single "The Argument" in 1962.

Critical reception 

Cash Box (March 20, 1965): The earthy, driving sound of Ike and Tina Turner should draw their r&b fans in droves to this package of the duo's biggest hit numbers. The veteran team delivers a song with the same dynamic drive that has built up an enormous following over the years, including the rockin' "Tra La La" and "It's Gonna Work Out Fine" and the soulful "You Should've Treated Me Right." This package should get a great deal of acceptance from the r&b audience.

Reissues 
Ten tracks were reissued as Ike & Tina's Greatest Hits on Unart Records in 1967 and Sunset Records in 1970. The missing tracks are "I'm Jealous" and "Don't Play Me Cheap."

Track listing 
All tracks written by Ike Turner, except where indicated.

References 

1965 greatest hits albums
Ike & Tina Turner compilation albums
Sue Records albums